Hilde Quintens (born 2 October 1964) is a Belgian cyclist born in Zolder. She participates mainly in cyclo-cross. In 2003 and 2006 she became Belgian national champion in cyclo-cross.

Honours

Cyclo-cross
 2002 : 3rd in Belgian elite national championships
 2002 : 2nd in Hoogerheide
 2003 : 2nd in Gavere-Asper
 2003 : 1st in Belgian elite national championships
 2003 : 2nd in Lille, Belgium
 2003 : 3rd in Vossem
 2003 : 1st in Overijse
 2003 : 3rd in Kersttrofee Hofstade
 2003 : 3rd in Loenhout
 2004 : 1st in Gavere-Asper
 2005 : 3rd in Lille, Belgium
 2005 : 1st in Gavere-Asper
 2006 : 1st in Belgian elite national championships
 2006 : 1st in Gavere-Asper (2006/07 Cyclo-cross Superprestige)

External links
 

Living people
1964 births
Belgian female cyclists
Cyclo-cross cyclists
People from Heusden-Zolder
Cyclists from Limburg (Belgium)
Belgian cyclo-cross champions